"Madama Butterfly International Concours in Nagasaki" is a singing competition for Soprano, Mezzo-soprano, Tenor, and Baritone held in Nagasaki-city, Japan.

The Hosts:  Nagasaki City Government: Nagasaki International Tourism & Convention Association: The Working Committee Office of "Madama Butterfly International Concours in Nagasaki" 

Celebrating 100 years since the first performance in Milan, Italy, "Madama Butterfly International Concours in Nagasaki" (Biennale) started where the original story of "Madama Butterfly" was written as its background.

Soprano  is required  of “Un bel dì, vedremo” from Madama Butterfly. Tenor  is  required of “Addio, fiorito asil” from it.
First stage: CD or MD (Mini Disc) screening
Second  and Final stages: Live in Nagasaki, Japan

History
In 2004, the first competition, 45 singers participated from 4 countries in Second Stage in Nagasaki. 
In 2006, the second competition, 39 singers participated from 6 countries in Second Stage in Nagasaki. 
In 2008, the third competition, 44 singers participated from 6 countries in Second Stage in Nagasaki.
In 2011, the fourth competition, 49 singers participated from 7 countries in Second Stage in Nagasaki.

2016 Competition
The Application Process  for 2016 competition:  May 16 2016.　All applications must arrive or be made by this date
Eligible birth dates are on or after November 25 1976, and on or before November 24 1998.
Deadline  for applications: May 16 2016.

Winners

Top
 2004 Megumi Norimatu, Soprano (Japan)
 2006 LuWa Ke, Soprano (China) 
 2008 Kim Jeong-Kyu, Tenor (Korea)
 2011 Yu Liu, Tenor (China)

Second
 2004 Zhou Jin Hua, Tenor (China)
 2006 Hwang Byong-nam, Tenor (Korea)
 2008 Naoyuki Okada, Tenor (Japan)
 2011 Huanhuan Ma, Soprano (China) 

Third
 2004 Zheng Tian Qin, Soprano (China)
 2006 Joung Sung-mi, Soprano (Korea)
 2008 Kai Wang, Tenor (China)
 2011 Gukhoe Song, Baritone (Korea)

External links 
 Madama Butterfly International Concours in Nagasaki

See also 
 List of classical music competitions

Opera competitions
Music competitions in Japan